Alton Miller is an American, Detroit-based DJ, producer, singer, and percussionist, as well as a pioneer of Detroit house music.

Detroit-based producer, singer, and percussionist Alton Miller has been playing a fundamental role in defining House Music for over three decades.Born in Chicago and raised in Detroit on Stevie Wonder, Santana, Parliament Funkadelic and the Philly Sound, Alton Miller’s early roots in soul music led to an affinity for clubbing and the perfect storm of music, dance, and skill that is required to create it. Alton began developing his deejaying skills under the electrifying energy of House Music founding fathers like Larry Levan and Timmy Regisford, whereas he was often going to Ron Hardy’s Music Box and Frankie Knuckles’s private loft parties in Chicago. Drawing on Detroit’s rich dance club’s heritage, with seminal places like Club Heaven and L’Uomo, Miller opened the legendary club The Music Institute, in 1988, along with his like-minded friends Chez Damier and George Baker. Alton Miller has lived in France,Belgium and South Africa, where he continues to pursue his musical creation process. His travels have allowed him to discover other cultures and make a name for himself all around the globe. He has played on every continent and toured several countries including Japan, Vietnam, Tunisia, Europe, Australia, and New Zealand as well as prominent festivals like Movement,Lovefest, House in the Park and AfroPunk. He has released music on some of the best independent labels in the industry such as Detroit renowned Planet E and Mahogani Music and Europeans Defected and Neroli Records. Prolific producer, Alton Miller continues to further his musical endeavors with releases on labels, including his own InnerMuse Recordings and Music Institute Records. Since 2019, Miller has been cultivating his connection with South Africa’s thriving house music scene. That same year, he created the Alton Miller Foundation to help youth to develop life skills and frequently is asked to speak at workshops and symposiums about his experiences and contributions to Electronic music and House music.His next album,the highly anticipated “Now Is The Time, is scheduled for release in 2023 on Sound Signature, Theo Parrish’s record label. Two singles have been already released from the album, “Bring Me Down” in December 2017, and “Love Don’t Pass Me By” in August 2022.

Discography

Albums 
 Rhythm Exposed (Distance) 2000  			
 Stories From Bohemia (Peacefrog Records) 2003 	
 Souls Like Mine (R2 Records) 2007 		
 Light Years Away (Mixed Signals Music) 2010

Singles 
 Pleasure Baby (Serious Grooves) 1993
 I Like Havin' You (Cyren America Records), (Inner Child Records) 1993
  It's Gonna Be Alright (KMS) avec Patrick Scott 1994 		
 Lolita 20:20 Vision avec Urban Farmers 1996
 Sky Musicaux EP (Distance) 1996
 Jazzin' It E.P. (M3) 1997	
 Get It Up / Big Phreek / You Were There (Soul City) avec Marc Pharaoh et Greg Cash 1997
 Blue Funk (M3) 1997
 Untitled (Planet E)	1998
 Progressions / Time & Space (Guidance Recordings) 1998
 Sweet In The Morning / Vibrations (Distance) 1999
 Song Of The Drum (Moods & Grooves) 1999
 Spaces & Places EP (Track Mode) 1999
 Deep Experience EP (Chord 44 Records) 2000
 Glory (Life Line) avec Dorothea Lynn Sharon 2000
 Love Ballad (Distance) 2000
 Paradise (Track Mode) 2001
Ease Your Mind (Muse Recordings) 2001
 Soundscapes & Vibes (Moods & Grooves) 2002
 A Minor - Simple Pleasures (Muse Recordings) 2002
  Love Inside (Nite Grooves) 2002
 Shine On Me (KDJ) 2002
 Nu Forms EP (Track Mode) 2003
 Choose To Believe (Mahogani Music) 2003
 Clouds Are Gone (Deeper Soul) 2005	
 Prelude To A Motion EP (Atal) avec Boddhi Satva 2006 			
 Possibilities (R2 Records) avec Lady Linn 2007
 Inner8 Remixes (Clone) 2008
 Full Circle (Yore Records) 2008
 In Flight (Yore Records) 2008
 Different Hours Revisited (Yore Records) avec Andy Vaz 2008 			
 Play The Game / Time On 2 (ProgCity Deep) 2009	
 Seeing Sound (Seasons Limited) 2009		
 When The Morning Comes (Superb Entertainment Records) avec Amp Fiddler 2010	
 Choice Cuts / Selected Works 1991-2009 Vol.4 (Inner Muse) 2010	
 Can't Hide It (ProgCity Deep) 2010
 Beautiful (Mixed Signals Music) 2011		
 Something 4 You - The Pirahnahead Remixes (Whasdat Music) 2012	
 Ngizo Ku Linda (Moods & Grooves) avec Bantu Soul 2014	
 More Funky Shit (Orange Records)

References

External links
 Discogs
 High Five Magazine

Year of birth missing (living people)
Living people
Musicians from Detroit
Record producers from Michigan
Peacefrog Records artists